Rudolf Perešin (25 March 1958 – 2 May 1995) was a Croatian fighter pilot serving in the Yugoslav Air Force (JRZ) during the 1991–95 Croatian War of Independence who defected to the Croatian side in October 1991, by flying his MiG-21 fighter jet from Željava Air Base to Klagenfurt, Austria, on a reconnaissance flight for the JRZ. He was the first pilot to desert from the Yugoslav Air Force. Following his defection he continued to fly missions for the Croatian Air Force and was shot down in May 1995 by Serb Krajina military forces, resulting in his death.

Biography
Perešin was born in the village of Jakšinec near Gornja Stubica, north of the Croatian capital Zagreb. He enrolled at the Yugoslav Military Pilot Academy in Zadar, and graduated in 1981 at the top of his class as one of the best fighter pilots of the Yugoslav Air Force.

In 1991, during the early stages of the war, Perešin decided to defect in order to help defend his homeland. Like all Croatian-born personnel, he was under close surveillance by his commanding officers. On 25 October 1991 Perešin flew his MiG-21R from the Željava Air Base and landed in Klagenfurt, Austria. His defection as well as his statement that he is a "Croat and I cannot and will not fire upon my Croatia" proved to be a significant moral boost for the Croatian forces.

On 2 May 1995, while providing close air support to the Croatian Army during Operation Flash he was shot down over Stara Gradiška by anti-aircraft artillery from the Serb Krajina forces. His remains were not recovered and returned until 4 August 1997. On 15 September 1997 Perešin was buried with full military honors at the Mirogoj cemetery in Zagreb.

Today, the Croatian Air Force Flying School in Zadar and the Aeronautical Technical High School in Velika Gorica are both named in his honor.

The MiG-21 aircraft number 26112 Perešin used to defect was transported to the Heeresgeschichtliches Museum (military history museum) in Vienna and briefly shown to the public there. It was publicly displayed at Zeltweg Air Base during the AirPower11 national air show in 2011. After a protracted international ownership dispute, with competing claims from Croatia and Serbia, in 2019 the aircraft was transported from the Zeltweg Military Museum to Croatia.

References

External links

 
 http://arhiva.kurir-info.rs/Arhiva/2007/jun/14/V-03-14062007.shtml
 http://www.zeljava-lybi.com/Zeljava-Rudi_eng.html

1958 births
1995 deaths
Burials at Mirogoj Cemetery
Croatian army officers
Military personnel of the Croatian War of Independence
Military personnel killed in the Croatian War of Independence
Aviators killed by being shot down
Officers of the Yugoslav People's Army
Yugoslav defectors
Order of Duke Domagoj recipients
Order of Nikola Šubić Zrinski recipients
Croatian military personnel killed in action